1999 Júbilo Iwata season

Competitions

Domestic results

J.League 1

Emperor's Cup

J.League Cup

Player statistics

Other pages
 J.League official site

Jubilo Iwata
Júbilo Iwata seasons